Jousseaume is a surname. Notable people with the surname include:

 André Jousseaume (1894–1960), French equestrian and Olympic champion
 Félix Pierre Jousseaume (1835–1921), French zoologist and malacologist

French-language surnames